James Jones (known by his stage name Middle Walter) (July 16, 1935 - November 1, 1986) was an American blues harmonica player. He was based in Gary, Indiana.

Career
Middle Walter was born in  Augusta, Arkansas, United States. His stage name was given to him by Johnny Littlejohn, placing him between Big Walter Horton and Little Walter Jacobs.

He was featured in issue 63 of Juke Blues magazine. The times when he was most active was during the 1950s and 1960s. He also played harmonica for Big Daddy Simpson and Melvin Simpson. In the 1970s, he played bass for The Kansas City Red Blues. Towards the end of his life, he toured with Big Daddy Kinsey and the Kinsey Report.

He died in November 1986, aged 51.

Touring partners
Big Daddy Simpson
Melvin Simpson
The Kansas City Red Blues
Big Daddy Kinsey and The Kinsey Report

References

1935 births
1986 deaths
American blues harmonica players
Harmonica blues musicians
People from Augusta, Arkansas
20th-century American musicians